Narovchat is a rural locality (a selo) and the administrative center of Narovchatsky District, Penza Oblast, Russia. Population:

Notable residents 

Mikhail Frinovsky (1898–1940), deputy head of the NKVD in the years of the Great Purge
Aleksandr Kuprin (1870–1938), writer of novels

References

Notes

See also
Mukhsha

Sources

Rural localities in Penza Oblast
Narovchatsky Uyezd
Narovchatsky District